Khoroshevo is a rural locality (a village) and the administrative center of Komyanskoye Rural Settlement, Gryazovetsky District, Vologda Oblast, Russia. The population was 924 as of 2002. There are 6 streets.

Geography 
Khoroshevo is located 21 km north of Gryazovets (the district's administrative centre) by road. Yudino is the nearest rural locality.

References 

Rural localities in Gryazovetsky District